Symphyotrichum georgianum (formerly Aster georgianus) is a rare species of flowering plant in the Asteraceae, the aster family. Its common name is Georgia aster. It is native to the southeastern United States where it is known from Alabama, Florida, Georgia, North Carolina, and South Carolina. , it may be extirpated from the state of Florida.

Description
They are oblong to lance-shaped with smooth or serrated margins. The flower heads are borne on rough-haired peduncles. The bracts are linear to lance-shaped. The stems, leaves, and some parts of the flower heads are covered with tiny glands on tiny stalks called "stipitate glands". The disk florets at the center are white to purplish. It blooms in October and November.

Distribution and habitat
Symphyotrichum georgianum is native to the southeastern United States where it is known from Alabama, Florida, Georgia, North Carolina, and South Carolina. , it may be extirpated from the state of Florida. 

It grows in oak-pine woodlands. Its local region was once covered in a post oak-savanna, and this species was a member of this ecosystem. This type of plant community depends on natural disturbance, such as wildfire, now largely destroyed or degraded by fire suppression and the removal of certain large grazing mammals. Georgia aster is therefore a relict species of this historic ecosystem and grows in remaining woodlands.

Conservation
Threats to the survival of the species include elimination of habitat disturbance such as fire, road construction, and herbicide application. , only 146 populations were estimated to remain.

Gallery

Citations

References

georgianum
Endemic flora of the United States
Flora of the Southeastern United States
Plants described in 1933
Taxa named by Edward Johnston Alexander